Marianne van der Torre (born 18 August 1961) is a Dutch former professional tennis player who was active during the 1980s.

She reached a highest singles ranking of world No. 84 in December 1981. During her career, van der Torre reached the second round of the singles event in two Grand Slam tournaments; the French Open (1981 and 1982) and the US Open (1981). Her best result at a Grand Slam championship was reaching the semifinal of the mixed doubles event at the 1988 Australian Open, partnering Martin Davis.

In October 1981, she partnered with compatriot Nanette Schutte to win the doubles title at the Borden Classic in Kyoto, defeating Elizabeth Smylie and Kim Steinmetz in the final, in straight sets.

Van der Torre was a member of the Dutch Federation Cup team between 1981 and 1987, playing in a total of 19 ties and compiling an 18–13 win–loss record.

In 1980, she received the Tom Schreursprijs for best Dutch sports talent.

WTA career finals

Singles: 1 (1 title)

Doubles: 1 (1 title)

ITF finals

Singles (4–4)

Doubles (14–10)

References

External links
 
 
 
 

1961 births
Living people
Dutch female tennis players
Sportspeople from Rotterdam
20th-century Dutch women
21st-century Dutch women